Edith Eduviere  (born 18 June 1986) is a female Nigerian football midfielder.

She was part of the Nigeria women's national football team  at the 2008 Summer Olympics.

See also
 Nigeria at the 2008 Summer Olympics

References

External links
 

1986 births
Living people
Nigerian women's footballers
Nigeria women's international footballers
Place of birth missing (living people)
Footballers at the 2008 Summer Olympics
Olympic footballers of Nigeria
Women's association football midfielders